Beinn Dearg (one of a number of Scottish hills of that name) is a mountain in the Inverlael area of the Highlands of Scotland. It is most frequently climbed by following the River Lael up Gleann na Sguaib. From this bealach, the neighbouring peaks of Cona' Mheall and Meall na Ceapraichean may also be climbed.

During early 2005, strong winds caused much damage to trees in the Inverlael Forest, almost completely blocking the route described.

Beinn Dearg is designated as a Special Protection Area. The area encompasses a diverse range of habitats, including woodland, mire, open water, dwarf-shrub heath, and cliffs. Most significantly, the summit areas support specialist mountain birds such as breeding dotterel Charadrius morinellus and golden eagle Aquila chrysaetos.

Footnotes

External links
Beinn Dearg SPA

Munros
Marilyns of Scotland
Mountains and hills of the Northwest Highlands
Special Protection Areas in Scotland
Sites of Special Scientific Interest in South East Sutherland
Sites of Special Scientific Interest in North Wester Ross and Cromarty
Sites of Special Scientific Interest in East Ross and Cromarty
One-thousanders of Scotland